Brücken-Hackpfüffel is a municipality in the Mansfeld-Südharz district, Saxony-Anhalt, Germany. It was formed on 1 January 2009 by the merger of the former municipalities Brücken and Hackpfüffel.

Geography 
The municipality lies north-east of the Kyffhäuser mountain in the Goldene Aue. Sangerhausen, the capital of Mansfeld-Südharz county is only 8 kilometers from the village of Brücken. The area of Brücken-Hackpfüffel stretches from the Unstrut tributary Helme in the north to the border with Thüringia in the south.

Historical population
Figures prior to 2009 are a sum of the two separate municipalities of Brücken and Hackpfüffel.

Census
Data as of 31 December, except for census years.

References

Mansfeld-Südharz